Ecology Flag may refer to:

Ecology Flag (American), created in the late 1960s
Ecology Flag (Australian), created in the late 1990s